Heng may refer to:

Name
 Heng (surname), a surname from Southeast Asia
 HENG abbreviation from "Hydrogen Enriched Natural Gas", see hydrogen compressed natural gas
 Heng, one of deities Heng and Ha

Letters 
 Heng (letter), an uncommon letter of the Latin alphabet combining  and the lower right hook from 
 Heng (Cyrillic), a rare letter of the Cyrillic alphabet
 Heng (stroke), the horizontal stroke  used in writing Chinese characters

Places 
 Heng (Rogaland), an island in Strand municipality, Rogaland county, Norway
 Heng County, in Guangxi, China
 Mount Heng (Hunan), mount in Hunan, China
 Mount Heng (Shanxi), mount in Shanxi, China